Kim Seng Single Member Constituency was a constituency in Singapore. The constituency was formed in 1972 as Kim Seng Constituency  by carving out parts of Bukit Ho Swee and Delta constituencies. In 1988, it was renamed as Kim Seng Single Member Constituency (SMC) as part of Singapore's political reforms. The SMC was merged into Kampong Glam Group Representation Constituency in 1991.

Member of Parliament

Elections

Elections in the 1970s

Elections in 1980s

References

Singaporean electoral divisions